Pauline Joyce Meyer (née Hutchison; June 4, 1943) is an American Charismatic Christian author, speaker, and president of Joyce Meyer Ministries.  Joyce and her husband, Dave, have four grown children and live outside St. Louis, Missouri. Her ministry is headquartered near the St. Louis suburb of Fenton, Missouri.

Early life
Meyer was born Pauline Joyce Hutchison in south St. Louis in 1943. Her father went into the army to fight in World War II soon after she was born. She has said in interviews that he began sexually abusing her upon his return, and discusses this experience in her meetings. To this day, she speaks with a working-class St. Louis accent.

A graduate of O'Fallon Technical High School in St. Louis, she married a part-time car salesman shortly after her senior year of high school. The marriage lasted five years. She maintains that her husband frequently cheated on her and persuaded her to steal payroll checks from her employer. They used the money to go on a vacation to California. She states that she returned the money years later. After her divorce, Meyer frequented local bars before meeting Dave Meyer, an engineering draftsman. They were married on January 7, 1967.

Conversion and ministry
Meyer also reports that during an intense prayer while driving to work one morning in 1976, she heard God call her name. She was born-again at age nine, but unhappiness drove her deeper into her faith. She got home later that day from a beauty appointment "full of liquid love" and was "drunk with the Spirit of God" that night while at the local bowling alley.

Meyer was briefly a member of Our Savior's Lutheran Church in St. Louis, a congregation of the Lutheran Church–Missouri Synod. She began leading an early-morning Bible class at a local cafeteria and became active in Life Christian Center, a charismatic church in Fenton. Within a few years, Meyer was the church's associate pastor. The church became one of the leading charismatic churches in the area, largely because of her popularity as a Bible teacher. She also began airing a daily 15-minute radio broadcast on a St. Louis radio station.

In 1985, Meyer resigned as associate pastor and founded her own ministry, initially called "Life in the Word." She began airing her radio show on six other stations from Chicago to Kansas City.

In 1993, her husband, Dave, suggested starting a television ministry. Initially airing on superstation WGN-TV in Chicago and Black Entertainment Television (BET), her program, now called Enjoying Everyday Life, is still on the air today.

In 2002, mainstream publisher Hachette Book Group paid Meyer over $10 million for the rights to her backlist catalog of independently released books.

In 2004, St. Louis Christian television station KNLC, operated by the Rev. Larry Rice of New Life Evangelistic Center, dropped Meyer's programming. According to Rice, a longstanding Meyer supporter, Meyer's "excessive lifestyle" and her teachings "often going beyond Scripture" were the impetus for canceling the program.

In 2005, Time magazine's "25 Most Influential Evangelicals in America" ranked Meyer as 17th.

Salary and finances

Meyer, who owns several homes and travels in a private jet (currently a Gulfstream G-IV), has been criticized for living an excessive lifestyle. She doesn't defend her spending habits because "... there's no need for us to apologize for being blessed." Meyer commented, "You can be a businessman here in St. Louis, and people think the more you have, the more wonderful it is ... but if you're a preacher, then all of a sudden it becomes a problem."

In November 2003, the St. Louis Post-Dispatch published a four-part special report detailing Meyer's "$10 million corporate jet, her husband's $107,000 silver-gray Mercedes sedan, her $2 million home and houses worth another $2 million for her four children," a $20 million headquarters, furnished with "$5.7 million worth of furniture, artwork, glassware, and the latest equipment and machinery," including a "$30,000 malachite round table, a $23,000 marble-topped antique commode, a $14,000 custom office bookcase, a $7,000 Stations of the Cross in Dresden porcelain, a $6,300 eagle sculpture on a pedestal, another eagle made of silver bought for $5,000, and numerous paintings purchased for $1,000 to $4,000 each," among many other expensive items – all paid for by the ministry. The articles prompted Wall Watchers (a Christian nonprofit watchdog group) to call on the Internal Revenue Service (IRS) to investigate Meyer and her family.

Following the adverse publicity about her lifestyle and Ministry Watch's request for an IRS probe, Meyer announced in 2004 plans to take a salary reduction from the $900,000 per year she had been receiving from Joyce Meyer Ministries (in addition to the $450,000 her husband received) and instead personally keep more of the royalties from her outside book sales which Meyer had previously donated back to Joyce Meyer Ministries. She now retains royalties on books sold outside the ministry through retail outlets such as Walmart, Amazon.com, and bookstores, while continuing to donate to her ministry royalties from books sold through her conferences, catalogues, website, and television program. "The net effect of all of this," notes Ministry Watch, "was most likely a sizable increase in the personal compensation of Joyce Meyer and reduced revenues for JMM." In an article in the St. Louis Business Journal, Meyer's public relations director, Mark Sutherland, confirmed that her new income would be "way above" her previous levels. Joyce Meyer Ministries says it has made a commitment to maintain transparency in financial dealings,
publish their annual reports, have a Board majority who are not Meyer relatives and submit to a voluntary annual audit. On December 18, 2008, this ministry received a "C" grade (71–80 score) for financial transparency from Ministry Watch.

Joyce Meyer Ministries was one of six investigated by the United States Senate inquiry into the tax-exempt status of religious organizations by Senator Chuck Grassley. The inquiry sought to determine if Meyer made any personal profit from financial donations, asking for a detailed accounting for such things as cosmetic surgery and foreign bank accounts and citing such expenses as the $23,000 commode mentioned earlier. Grassley also requested that Meyer's ministry make the information available by December 6, 2007. In her November 29 response to Grassley, Meyer notes that the commode is a chest of drawers. Meyer writes that it was part of a large lot of items totaling $262,000 that were needed to furnish the ministry's  headquarters purchased in 2001. She said the commode's price tag was an "errant value" assigned by the selling agent and apologized for "not paying close attention to specific 'assigned values' placed on the pieces." Joyce Meyer Ministries responded with a newsletter to its e-mail list subscribers on November 9, 2007. The organization referred to its annual financial reports, asserting that, in 2006, the ministry spent 82 percent of its total expenses "for outreach and program services toward reaching people with the Gospel of Jesus Christ, as attested by independent accounting firm Stanfield & O'Dell, LLP." The message also quoted an October 10, 2007, letter from the Internal Revenue Service which stated, "We determined that you [Joyce Meyer Ministries] continue to qualify as an organization exempt from federal income tax under IRC section 501(c)(3)." The same information was also posted to the ministry website. Joyce Meyer Ministries was one of two ministries to comply with the Senate's requests for financial records. It also made commitments to future financial transparency. Neither party were found to have done any wrongdoing.

ECFA accreditation
In 2009, Joyce Meyer Ministries received accreditation from the Evangelical Council for Financial Accountability (ECFA). In an announcement on March 12, 2009, the ECFA said that Joyce Meyer Ministries and Oral Roberts University had met their requirements of  "'responsible stewardship', which involves ministries' financial accountability, transparency, board governance and fund-raising practices."

2011 wrongful death lawsuit
On May 5, 2009, Christopher Coleman, the chief of security of Joyce Meyer Ministries was arrested on suspicion of murder after police discovered the bodies of Coleman's wife, Sheri Coleman, and two sons at their residence having died of apparent strangulation. On May 10, 2011, after a lengthy trial, Christopher Coleman was found guilty of three counts of first-degree murder and was sentenced to three life sentences. According to the prosecuting attorney Kris Reitz, the murders were committed as part of a premeditated plan to leave his wife for another woman who he had been having an affair with, according to Reitz, Coleman was concerned that if his extra-marital affair were made public it would result in him losing his job at Joyce Meyer Ministries. Meyer provided prerecorded testimony during Coleman's criminal trial.  The case was featured in an episode of Forensic Files II on March 6, 2022, titled "Words Matter".

The family of Sheri Coleman filed a wrongful-death lawsuit against Joyce Meyer Ministries citing that the deaths of the three to be the result of Meyer's negligence as a counselor. According to the suit, Christopher Coleman had  anonymously sent several threatening letters to his family as a way to remove suspicion from himself for the murder. The suit also alleged that as counselor for both Christopher and Sheri Coleman, Meyer should have had reasonable suspicion that the letters were sent by Coleman and warned Sheri. The suit was dismissed by Circuit Judge Richard Aguirre in 2013.

Selected bibliography
 
 
 
 
 
 
 
 
 
 
 
  (by Joyce Meyer and Deborah Bedford)
 
 
 
  (by Joyce Meyer and Phil Pringle)

See also
 Prosperity theology
 Word of Faith

References
Notes

External links
 
 

1943 births
Living people
20th-century American non-fiction writers
20th-century Christians
21st-century American non-fiction writers
21st-century Christians
American Charismatics
American Christian writers
American evangelicals
American self-help writers
American television evangelists
Charismatic and Pentecostal Christianity
Christian media
Christians from Missouri
Oral Roberts University people
Writers from St. Louis
American women non-fiction writers
20th-century American women writers
21st-century American women writers
Evangelicalism in Missouri
Televangelists from Missouri